The Little Doe River is a river located in Carter County, Tennessee. It forms from the confluence of Simerly Creek and Tiger Creek near the community of Tiger Valley, and runs in a northerly direction alongside U.S. Route 19E until its termination into Doe River just south of the town of Hampton, Tennessee.

See also
List of rivers of Tennessee

References

Rivers of Tennessee
Rivers of Carter County, Tennessee
Hampton, Tennessee